NGC 7836 is an irregular or spiral galaxy located about 260 million light-years away in the constellation of Andromeda. It was discovered by astronomer Lewis Swift on September 20, 1885.

NGC 7836 is a member of the NGC 7831 Group and is part of the Perseus–Pisces Supercluster.

See also 
 List of NGC objects (7001–7840)

References

External links 

7836
608
Andromeda (constellation)
Astronomical objects discovered in 1885
Spiral galaxies
65
Perseus-Pisces Supercluster
Irregular galaxies
Discoveries by Lewis Swift